The Last Straw is an Australian jazz ensemble formed in 1974. They were nominated for the 1991 ARIA Award for Best Jazz Album for their self-titled album.

Members
John Pochée – drums
Bernie McGann – alto saxophone
Ken James – tenor saxophone
Jack Thorncraft – bass
Dave Levy – piano
Tony Esterman – piano
Ron Philpott – bass
Lloyd Swanton – bass
David Seidel – bass

Discography

Albums

Awards and nominations

ARIA Music Awards
The ARIA Music Awards is an annual awards ceremony that recognises excellence, innovation, and achievement across all genres of Australian music. They commenced in 1987. 

! 
|-
| 1991
| The Last Straw
| Best Jazz Album
| 
| 
|-

References

Australian jazz ensembles